Curling at the 2009 European Youth Olympic Winter Festival was held from 16 to 20 February 2009. It was held in Bielsko-Biała, Poland.

Results

Medal table

Medalists

References 

2009 European Youth Olympic Winter Festival
2009 in curling
2009